The 2018–19 Toronto Raptors season was the 24th season of the franchise in the National Basketball Association (NBA). During the off-season, the Raptors acquired small forward Kawhi Leonard from the San Antonio Spurs after trading franchise star DeMar DeRozan. The season ended with the franchise's first NBA Finals appearance and first NBA championship, ending the City of Toronto's, 27-year championship drought if not counting Toronto FC’s 2017 MLS championship or Toronto Argonauts multiple Grey Cup Championships. The Raptors were one of two teams to have an offense and defensive rating that both ranked in the top 5 of the NBA. This iteration of the Raptors is considered one of the most complete teams in NBA history. 

On May 11, 2018, the Raptors fired Dwane Casey after the team was swept by the Cleveland Cavaliers for the second consecutive time in the postseason. On June 14, the Raptors promoted assistant coach Nick Nurse as their head coach. The Raptors played their home games at newly renamed Scotiabank Arena. For the first time since 2008–09, DeMar DeRozan (who spent his first nine seasons in the NBA with the Raptors) did not play for the Raptors, as he was traded, along with Jakob Poeltl and a protected 2019 first-round draft pick, to the San Antonio Spurs for Kawhi Leonard and Danny Green. Later, on February 7, 2019, at the trade deadline, the Memphis Grizzlies traded Marc Gasol to the Raptors for Jonas Valančiūnas, Delon Wright and C. J. Miles. The Raptors later signed Jeremy Lin.

The Raptors finished the regular season with a 58–24 record, one less win than their franchise best the previous season, second best in the league for the second consecutive season, earning the second seed in the Eastern Conference. They also won their fifth Atlantic Division title in six years.

In the playoffs, the Raptors defeated the Orlando Magic in five games in the first round. They edged the Philadelphia 76ers in seven games in the semifinals to make their first Eastern Conference Finals appearance since 2016, with Kawhi Leonard's buzzer-beater over Joel Embiid, giving the Raptors a 92–90 victory in the series-clinching game 7. The series was a rematch of the 2001 Eastern Conference Semifinals, where the Allen Iverson-led 76ers defeated the Vince Carter-led Raptors in seven games. The Raptors defeated the Milwaukee Bucks in the Eastern Conference Finals 4–2, winning the last four games of the series after being down 0–2 to become the sixth team to overcome that deficit. They won the Finals against the two-time defending NBA champion Golden State Warriors, also the first NBA Finals series that was played outside the United States. They beat the Warriors 4–2, becoming the first  non-US team to win the NBA title. The Raptors were the first Atlantic Division team since the 2007–08 Boston Celtics and the first Eastern Conference team since the 2015–16 Cleveland Cavaliers to win the championship.  Prior to the Raptors victory, the Atlantic Division had had the second longest title drought in the league. The Northwest Division will hold the record for having the longest championship drought of all divisions in the league, with the 1978–79 Seattle Supersonics being the last champion. This is also Toronto's first major sports championship since the Toronto Blue Jays won the 1993 World Series when not counting Toronto FC’s 2017 MLS championship or Toronto Argonauts multiple Grey Cup Championships.

Draft

The Raptors did not have a pick in the 2018 NBA draft. They had previously traded their selections to the Brooklyn Nets, who ended up drafting Džanan Musa, and to the Phoenix Suns, who ended up drafting George King.

Roster

Standings

Division

Conference

Record vs opponents

(* game decided in overtime)

Game log

Preseason 

|- style="background:#cfc;"
| 1
| September 29
| Portland
| 
| Valančiūnas (17)
| Siakam (13)
| Leonard, Siakam, VanVleet (3)
| Rogers Arena18,654
| 1–0
|- style="background:#fcc;"
| 2
| October 2
| @ Utah
| 
| Valančiūnas (18)
| Siakam, Valančiūnas (9)
| VanVleet (3)
| Vivint Smart Home Arena18,306
| 1–1
|- style="background:#cfc;"
| 3
| October 5
| Melbourne
| 
| Powell (21)
| Ibaka (12)
| Wright (5)
| Scotiabank Arena15,781
| 2–1
|- style="background:#cfc;"
| 4
| October 10
| Brooklyn
| 
| Green (22)
| Leonard, Valančiūnas (7)
| Leonard, Lowry (7)
| Bell CentreN/A
| 3–1
|- style="background:#cfc;"
| 5
| October 11
| @ New Orleans
| 
| Richardson, Siakam (21)
| Moreland (12)
| Felder, Siakam (6)
| Smoothie King Center15,047
| 4–1

Regular season 

|- style="background:#cfc
| 1
| October 17
| Cleveland
| 
| Kyle Lowry (27)
| Leonard, Valančiūnas (12)
| Kyle Lowry (8)
| Scotiabank Arena19,915
| 1–0
|- style="background:#cfc
| 2
| October 19
| Boston
| 
| Kawhi Leonard (31)
| Kawhi Leonard (10)
| Fred VanVleet (7)
| Scotiabank Arena19,800
| 2–0
|- style="background:#cfc
| 3
| October 20
| @ Washington
| 
| Kyle Lowry (28)
| Pascal Siakam (10)
| Kyle Lowry (12)
| Capital One Arena16,185
| 3–0
|- style="background:#cfc
| 4
| October 22
| Charlotte
| 
| Kawhi Leonard (22)
| Jonas Valančiūnas (10)
| Kyle Lowry (14)
| Scotiabank Arena19,800
| 4–0
|- style="background:#cfc
| 5
| October 24
| Minnesota
| 
| Kawhi Leonard (35)
| Jonas Valančiūnas (9)
| Kyle Lowry (10)
| Scotiabank Arena19,800
| 5–0
|- style="background:#cfc
| 6
| October 26
| Dallas
| 
| Kawhi Leonard (21)
| Kawhi Leonard (9)
| Kyle Lowry (12)
| Scotiabank Arena19,800
| 6–0
|- style="background:#fcc
| 7
| October 29
| @ Milwaukee
| 
| Serge Ibaka (30)
| Serge Ibaka (9)
| Kyle Lowry (15)
| Fiserv Forum17,341
| 6–1
|- style="background:#cfc
| 8
| October 30
| Philadelphia
| 
| Kawhi Leonard (31)
| Pascal Siakam (15)
| Kyle Lowry (12)
| Scotiabank Arena19,800
| 7–1

|- style="background:#cfc
| 9
| November 2
| @ Phoenix
| 
| Kawhi Leonard (19)
| Jonas Valančiūnas (7)
| Kyle Lowry (12)
| Talking Stick Resort Arena15,843
| 8–1
|- style="background:#cfc
| 10
| November 4
| @ L.A. Lakers
| 
| Serge Ibaka (34)
| Pascal Siakam (13)
| Kyle Lowry (15)
| Staples Center18,997 
| 9–1
|- style="background:#cfc
| 11
| November 5
| @ Utah
| 
| Anunoby, Ibaka, Lowry, VanVleet (17)
| Lowry, Siakam (7)
| Kyle Lowry (11)
| Vivint Smart Home Arena18,306
| 10–1
|- style="background:#cfc
| 12
| November 7
| @ Sacramento
| 
| Kawhi Leonard (25)
| Serge Ibaka (14)
| Kyle Lowry (8)
| Golden 1 Center17,583
| 11–1
|- style="background:#cfc
| 13
| November 10
| New York
| 
| Pascal Siakam (23)
| Jonas Valanciunas (10)
| Kyle Lowry (8)
| Scotiabank Arena19,800
| 12–1
|- style="background:#fcc
| 14
| November 12
| New Orleans
| 
| Pascal Siakam (22)
| Serge Ibaka (14)
| Kyle Lowry (11)
| Scotiabank Arena19,800
| 12–2
|- style="background:#fcc
| 15
| November 14
| Detroit
| 
| Kawhi Leonard (26)
| Leonard, Monroe (9)
| Kyle Lowry (7)
| Scotiabank Arena19,800
| 12–3
|- style="background:#fcc
| 16
| November 16
| @ Boston
| 
| Kawhi Leonard (31)
| Kawhi Leonard (15)
| Kyle Lowry (7)
| TD Garden18,624
| 12–4
|- style="background:#cfc
| 17
| November 17
| @ Chicago
| 
| Fred VanVleet (18)
| Jonas Valanciunas (9)
| Kyle Lowry (8)
| United Center21,263
| 13–4
|- style="background:#cfc
| 18
| November 20
| @ Orlando
| 
| Kawhi Leonard (18)
| Ibaka, Siakam (9)
| Kyle Lowry (7)
| Amway Center16,016
| 14–4
|- style="background:#cfc
| 19
| November 21
| @ Atlanta
| 
| Jonas Valanciunas (24)
| Jonas Valanciunas (13)
| Kyle Lowry (17)
| State Farm Arena15,058
| 15–4
|- style="background:#cfc
| 20
| November 23
| Washington
| 
| Kawhi Leonard (27)
| Kawhi Leonard (10)
| Kyle Lowry (9)
| Scotiabank Arena19,800
| 16–4
|- style="background:#cfc
| 21
| November 25
| Miami
| 
| Kawhi Leonard (29)
| Leonard, Valanciunas (10)
| Kyle Lowry (10)
| Scotiabank Arena19,800
| 17–4
|- style="background:#cfc
| 22
| November 27
| @ Memphis
| 
| Kyle Lowry (24)
| Kawhi Leonard (10)
| Kyle Lowry (6)
| FedExForum14,187
| 18–4
|- style="background:#cfc
| 23
| November 29
| Golden State
| 
| Kawhi Leonard (37)
| Leonard, Lowry (8)
| Kyle Lowry (12)
| Scotiabank Arena19,800
| 19–4

|- style="background:#cfc
| 24
| December 1
| @ Cleveland
| 
| Kawhi Leonard (34)
| Kawhi Leonard (9)
| Pascal Siakam (5)
| Quicken Loans Arena19,432
| 20–4
|- style="background:#fcc
| 25
| December 3
| Denver
| 
| Kawhi Leonard (27)
| Jonas Valančiūnas (10)
| Kyle Lowry (11)
| Scotiabank Arena19,800
| 20–5
|- style="background:#cfc
| 26
| December 5
| Philadelphia
| 
| Kawhi Leonard (36)
| Kawhi Leonard (9)
| Pascal Siakam (6)
| Scotiabank Arena19,800
| 21–5
|- style="background:#fcc
| 27
| December 7
| @ Brooklyn
| 
| Kawhi Leonard (32)
| Jonas Valančiūnas (8)
| Kyle Lowry (11)
| Barclays Center14,035
| 21–6
|- style="background:#fcc
| 28
| December 9
| Milwaukee
| 
| Serge Ibaka (22)
| Kawhi Leonard (8)
| Kyle Lowry (7)
| Scotiabank Arena19,800
| 21–7
|- style="background:#cfc
| 29
| December 11
| @ L.A. Clippers
| 
| Serge Ibaka (25)
| Serge Ibaka (9)
| Fred VanVleet (14)
| Staples Center17,812
| 22–7
|- style="background:#cfc
| 30
| December 12
| @ Golden State
| 
| Kyle Lowry (23)
| Serge Ibaka (12)
| Kyle Lowry (12)
| Oracle Arena19,596
| 23–7
|- style="background:#fcc
| 31 
| December 14
| @ Portland
| 
| Kawhi Leonard (28)
| Danny Green (11)
| Fred VanVleet (8)
| Moda Center19,458
| 23–8
|- style="background:#fcc
| 32
| December 16
| @ Denver
| 
| Kawhi Leonard (29)
| Kawhi Leonard (14)
| Leonard, Wright (4)
| Pepsi Center19,520
| 23–9
|- style="background:#cfc
| 33
| December 19
| Indiana
| 
| Kawhi Leonard (28)
| Kawhi Leonard (10)
| Kawhi Leonard (6)
| Scotiabank Arena19,800
| 24–9
|- style="background:#cfc
| 34
| December 21
| Cleveland
| 
| Kawhi Leonard (37)
| Pascal Siakam (10)
| Fred VanVleet (8)
| Scotiabank Arena19,800
| 25–9
|- style="background:#fcc
| 35
| December 22
| @ Philadelphia
| 
| Pascal Siakam (26)
| Greg Monroe (8)
| Kyle Lowry (5)
| Wells Fargo Center20,691
| 25–10
|- style="background:#cfc
| 36
| December 26
| @ Miami
| 
| Kawhi Leonard (30)
| Pascal Siakam (9)
| Serge Ibaka (4)
| American Airlines Arena19,902
| 26–10
|- style="background:#fcc
| 37
| December 28
| @ Orlando
| 
| Kawhi Leonard (21)
| Serge Ibaka (8)
| Delon Wright (6)
| Amway Center18,846
| 26–11
|- style="background:#cfc
| 38
| December 30
| Chicago
| 
| Kawhi Leonard (27)
| Pascal Siakam (12)
| Fred VanVleet (7)
| Scotiabank Arena19,800
| 27–11

|- style="background:#cfc
| 39 
| January 1
| Utah
| 
| Kawhi Leonard (45)
| Pascal Siakam (10)
| Fred VanVleet (5)
| Scotiabank Arena19,800
| 28–11
|- style="background:#fcc
| 40
| January 3
| @ San Antonio
| 
| Kawhi Leonard (21)
| Ibaka, Monroe, Siakam (6)
| Pascal Siakam (7)
| AT&T Center18,354
| 28–12
|- style="background:#cfc
| 41
| January 5
| @ Milwaukee
| 
| Leonard, Siakam (30)
| Serge Ibaka (9)
| Fred VanVleet (8)
| Fiserv Forum18,028
| 29–12
|- style="background:#cfc
| 42
| January 6
| Indiana
| 
| Norman Powell (23)
| Pascal Siakam (10)
| Lowry, VanVleet (8)
| Scotiabank Arena19,800
| 30–12
|- style="background:#cfc
| 43
| January 8
| Atlanta
| 
| Kawhi Leonard (31)
| Pascal Siakam (10)
| Leonard, Lowry (6)
| Scotiabank Arena19,800
| 31–12
|- style="background:#cfc
| 44
| January 11
| Brooklyn
| 
| Kawhi Leonard (20)
| Kawhi Leonard (11)
| Kyle Lowry (8)
| Scotiabank Arena19,800
| 32–12
|- style="background:#cfc
| 45
| January 13
| @ Washington
| 
| Kawhi Leonard (41)
| Pascal Siakam (19)
| Kyle Lowry (11)
| Capital One Arena16,919
| 33–12
|- style="background:#fcc
| 46
| January 16
| @ Boston
| 
| Kawhi Leonard (33)
| Serge Ibaka (10)
| Lowry, Siakam (7)
| TD Garden18,624
| 33–13
|- style="background:#cfc
| 47
| January 17
| Phoenix
| 
| Serge Ibaka (22)
| Pascal Siakam (12)
| Kyle Lowry (8)
| Scotiabank Arena19,800
| 34–13
|- style="background:#cfc
| 48
| January 19
| Memphis
| 
| Danny Green (24)
| Pascal Siakam (8)
| Lowry, VanVleet (7)
| Scotiabank Arena19,800
| 35–13
|- style="background:#cfc
| 49
| January 22
| Sacramento
| 
| Lowry, VanVleet (19)
| Serge Ibaka (10)
| Kyle Lowry (9)
| Scotiabank Arena19,800
| 36–13
|- style="background:#fcc
| 50
| January 23
| @ Indiana
| 
| Serge Ibaka (23)
| Serge Ibaka (11)
| Kyle Lowry (7)
| Bankers Life Fieldhouse16,879
| 36–14
|- style="background:#fcc
| 51
| January 25
| @ Houston
| 
| Kawhi Leonard (32)
| Serge Ibaka (14)
| Kyle Lowry (11)
| Toyota Center18,055
| 36–15
|- style="background:#cfc
| 52
| January 27
| @ Dallas
| 
| Kawhi Leonard (33)
| Serge Ibaka (11)
| Kyle Lowry (9)
| American Airlines Center20,308
| 37–15
|- style="background:#fcc
| 53
| January 31
| Milwaukee
| 
| Pascal Siakam (28)
| Serge Ibaka (10)
| Lowry, Siakam, VanVleet (3)
| Scotiabank Arena19,800
| 37–16

|- style="background:#cfc
| 54
| February 3
| L.A. Clippers
| 
| Kawhi Leonard (18)
| Serge Ibaka (12)
| Fred VanVleet (7)
| Scotiabank Arena19,800
| 38–16
|- style="background:#cfc
| 55
| February 5
| @ Philadelphia
| 
| Kawhi Leonard (24)
| Kyle Lowry (10)
| Kyle Lowry (6)
| Wells Fargo Center20,472
| 39–16
|- style="background:#cfc
| 56
| February 7
| @ Atlanta
| 
| Pascal Siakam (33)
| Pascal Siakam (14)
| Kyle Lowry (13)
| State Farm Arena16,036
| 40–16
|- style="background:#cfc
| 57
| February 9
| @ New York
| 
| Kyle Lowry (22)
| Serge Ibaka (13)
| Leonard, VanVleet (6)
| Madison Square Garden18,886
| 41–16
|- style="background:#cfc
| 58
| February 11
| Brooklyn
| 
| Kawhi Leonard (30)
| Serge Ibaka (12)
| Kawhi Leonard (8)
| Scotiabank Arena19,800
| 42–16
|- style="background:#cfc
| 59
| February 13
| Washington
| 
| Pascal Siakam (44)
| Serge Ibaka (13)
| Kyle Lowry (13)
| Scotiabank Arena19,800
| 43–16
|- style="background:#cfc
| 60
| February 22
| San Antonio
| 
| Kawhi Leonard (25)
| Serge Ibaka (15)
| Gasol, Siakam (6)
| Scotiabank Arena20,058
| 44–16
|- style="background:#fcc
| 61
| February 24
| Orlando
| 
| Kyle Lowry (19)
| Pascal Siakam (11)
| Kyle Lowry (10)
| Scotiabank Arena19,800
| 44–17
|- style="background:#cfc
| 62
| February 26
| Boston
| 
| Pascal Siakam (25)
| Pascal Siakam (8)
| Kyle Lowry (11)
| Scotiabank Arena19,800
| 45–17

|- style="background:#cfc
| 63
| March 1
| Portland
| 
| Kawhi Leonard (38)
| Marc Gasol (8)
| Kyle Lowry (10)
| Scotiabank Arena19,800
| 46–17
|- style="background:#fcc
| 64
| March 3
| @ Detroit
| 
| Kyle Lowry (35)
| Serge Ibaka (11)
| Gasol, Lowry, Siakam (5)
| Little Caesars Arena19,161
| 46–18
|- style="background:#fcc
| 65
| March 5
| Houston
| 
| Kawhi Leonard (26)
| Serge Ibaka (15)
| Kyle Lowry (6)
| Scotiabank Arena19,800
| 46–19
|- style="background:#cfc
| 66
| March 8
| @ New Orleans
| 
| Kawhi Leonard (31)
| Ibaka, Lowry (11)
| Kyle Lowry (12)
| Smoothie King Center17,325
| 47–19
|- style="background:#cfc
| 67
| March 10
| @ Miami
| 
| Kyle Lowry (24)
| Serge Ibaka (8)
| Kyle Lowry (10)
| American Airlines Arena19,600
| 48–19
|- style="background:#fcc
| 68
| March 11
| @ Cleveland
| 
| Kawhi Leonard (25)
| Kawhi Leonard (9)
| Kyle Lowry (6)
| Quicken Loans Arena15,012
| 48–20
|- style="background:#cfc
| 69
| March 14
| L.A. Lakers
| 
| Kawhi Leonard (25)
| Leonard, Powell (8)
| Pascal Siakam (6)
| Scotiabank Arena19,926
| 49–20
|- style="background:#fcc
| 70
| March 17
| @ Detroit
| 
| Kawhi Leonard (33)
| Marc Gasol (11)
| Marc Gasol (8)
| Little Caesars Arena19,277
| 49–21
|- style="background:#cfc
| 71
| March 18
| New York
| 
| Jeremy Lin (20)
| Marc Gasol (11)
| Fred VanVleet (12)
| Scotiabank Arena19,800
| 50–21
|- style="background:#cfc
| 72
| March 20
| @ Oklahoma City
| 
| Pascal Siakam (33)
| Pascal Siakam (13)
| Green, Leonard, Siakam, VanVleet (6)
| Chesapeake Energy Arena18,203
| 51–21
|- style="background:#fcc
| 73
| March 22
| Oklahoma City
| 
| Kawhi Leonard (37)
| Norman Powell (11)
| Marc Gasol (6)
| Scotiabank Arena20,014
| 51–22
|- style="background:#fcc
| 74
| March 24
| Charlotte
| 
| Kawhi Leonard (28)
| Kawhi Leonard (9)
| Gasol, Lowry (6)
| Scotiabank Arena19,800
| 51–23
|- style="background:#cfc
| 75
| March 26
| Chicago
| 
| Norman Powell (20)
| Serge Ibaka (8)
| Kyle Lowry (6)
| Scotiabank Arena19,800
| 52–23
|- style="background:#cfc
| 76
| March 28
| @ New York
| 
| Pascal Siakam (31)
| Serge Ibaka (10)
| Fred VanVleet (8)
| Madison Square Garden19,812
| 53–23
|- style="background:#cfc
| 77
| March 30
| @ Chicago
| 
| Ibaka, VanVleet (23)
| Serge Ibaka (12)
| Kyle Lowry (8)
| United Center21,238
| 54–23

|- style="background:#cfc
| 78
| April 1
| Orlando
| 
| Danny Green (29)
| Kawhi Leonard (7)
| Lowry, VanVleet (7)
| Scotiabank Arena19,800
| 55–23
|- style="background:#cfc
| 79
| April 3
| @ Brooklyn
| 
| Pascal Siakam (28)
| Serge Ibaka (12)
| Marc Gasol (6)
| Barclays Center17,732
| 56–23
|- style="background:#fcc
| 80
| April 5
| @ Charlotte
| 
| Kawhi Leonard (29)
| Serge Ibaka (12)
| Kyle Lowry (11)
| Spectrum Center18,684
| 56–24
|- style="background:#cfc
| 81
| April 7
| Miami
| 
| Powell, Siakam (23)
| Gasol, Siakam (10)
| Marc Gasol (7)
| Scotiabank Arena19,800
| 57–24
|- style="background:#cfc
| 82
| April 9
| @ Minnesota
| 
| Kawhi Leonard (20)
| Chris Boucher] (13)
| Jeremy Lin (5)
| Target Center16,119
| 58–24

Playoffs
see also 2019 NBA Playoffs and 2019 NBA Finals

|- style="background:#fcc;"
| 1
| April 13
| Orlando
| 
| Kawhi Leonard (25)
| Pascal Siakam (9)
| Kyle Lowry (8)
| Scotiabank Arena19,937
| 0–1
|- style="background:#cfc;"
| 2
| April 16
| Orlando
| 
| Kawhi Leonard (37)
| Pascal Siakam (10)
| Kyle Lowry (7)
| Scotiabank Arena19,964
| 1–1
|- style="background:#cfc;"
| 3
| April 19
| @ Orlando
| 
| Pascal Siakam (30)
| Pascal Siakam (11)
| Kyle Lowry (10)
| Amway Center19,367
| 2–1
|- style="background:#cfc;"
| 4
| April 21
| @ Orlando
| 
| Kawhi Leonard (34)
| Serge Ibaka (8)
| Kyle Lowry (9)
| Amway Center19,087
| 3–1
|- style="background:#cfc;"
| 5
| April 23
| Orlando
| 
| Kawhi Leonard (27)
| Marc Gasol (9)
| Fred VanVleet (10)
| Scotiabank Arena19,800
| 4–1

|- style="background:#cfc;"
| 1
| April 27
| Philadelphia
| 
| Kawhi Leonard (45)
| Kawhi Leonard (11)
| Kyle Lowry (8)
| Scotiabank Arena19,800
| 1–0
|- style="background:#fcc;"
| 2
| April 29
| Philadelphia
| 
| Kawhi Leonard (35)
| Gasol, Leonard, Siakam (7)
| Kawhi Leonard (6)
| Scotiabank Arena19,800
| 1–1
|- style="background:#fcc;"
| 3
| May 2
| @ Philadelphia
| 
| Kawhi Leonard (33)
| Gasol, Green (6)
| Kyle Lowry (5)
| Wells Fargo Center20,658
| 1–2
|- style="background:#cfc;"
| 4
| May 5
| @ Philadelphia
| 
| Kawhi Leonard (39)
| Kawhi Leonard (14)
| Kyle Lowry (7)
| Wells Fargo Center20,639
| 2–2
|- style="background:#cfc;"
| 5
| May 7
| Philadelphia
| 
| Pascal Siakam (25)
| Kawhi Leonard (13)
| Kyle Lowry (5)
| Scotiabank Arena20,287
| 3–2
|- style="background:#fcc;"
| 6
| May 9
| @ Philadelphia
| 
| Kawhi Leonard (29)
| Kawhi Leonard (12)
| Kyle Lowry (6)
| Wells Fargo Center20,525
| 3–3
|- style="background:#cfc;"
| 7
| May 12
| Philadelphia
| 
| Kawhi Leonard (41)
| Gasol, Siakam (11)
| Kyle Lowry (6)
| Scotiabank Arena20,917
| 4–3

|- style="background:#fcc;"
| 1
| May 15
| @ Milwaukee
| 
| Kawhi Leonard (31)
| Marc Gasol (12)
| Marc Gasol (5)
| Fiserv Forum17,345
| 0–1
|- style="background:#fcc;"
| 2
| May 17
| @ Milwaukee
| 
| Kawhi Leonard (31)
| Serge Ibaka (10)
| Kyle Lowry (4)
| Fiserv Forum17,570
| 0–2
|- style="background:#cfc;"
| 3
| May 19
| Milwaukee
| 
| Kawhi Leonard (36)
| Marc Gasol (12)
| Marc Gasol (7)
| Scotiabank Arena19,932
| 1–2
|- style="background:#cfc;"
| 4
| May 21
| Milwaukee
| 
| Kyle Lowry (25)
| Serge Ibaka (13)
| Marc Gasol (7)
| Scotiabank Arena20,237
| 2–2
|- style="background:#cfc;"
| 5
| May 23
| @ Milwaukee
| 
| Kawhi Leonard (35)
| Pascal Siakam (13)
| Kawhi Leonard (9)
| Fiserv Forum17,384
| 3–2
|- style="background:#cfc;"
| 6
| May 25
| Milwaukee
| 
| Kawhi Leonard (27)
| Kawhi Leonard (17)
| Kyle Lowry (8)
| Scotiabank Arena20,478
| 4–2

|- style="background:#cfc;"
| 1
| May 30
| Golden State
| 
| Pascal Siakam (32)
| Leonard, Siakam (8)
| Kyle Lowry (9)
| Scotiabank Arena19,983
| 1–0
|- style="background:#fcc;"
| 2
| June 2
| Golden State
| 
| Kawhi Leonard (34)
| Kawhi Leonard (14)
| Pascal Siakam (5)
| Scotiabank Arena20,014
| 1–1
|- style="background:#cfc;"
| 3
| June 5
| @ Golden State
| 
| Kawhi Leonard (30)
| Pascal Siakam (9)
| Kyle Lowry (9)
| Oracle Arena19,596
| 2–1
|- style="background:#cfc;"
| 4
| June 7
| @ Golden State
| 
| Kawhi Leonard (36)
| Kawhi Leonard (12)
| Kyle Lowry (7)
| Oracle Arena19,596
| 3–1
|- style="background:#fcc;"
| 5
| June 10
| Golden State
| 
| Kawhi Leonard (26)
| Kawhi Leonard (12)
| Leonard, Lowry (6)
| Scotiabank Arena20,144
| 3–2
|- style="background:#cfc;"
| 6
| June 13
| @ Golden State
| 
| Lowry, Siakam (26)
| Pascal Siakam (10)
| Kyle Lowry (10)
| Oracle Arena19,596
| 4–2

Player statistics

Regular season

|-
| align="left"| || align="center"| SF
| 67 || 6 || 1,352 || 197 || 47 || 46 || 22 || 469
|-
| align="left"| || align="center"| PF
| 28 || 0 || 163 || 56 || 2 || 6 || 24 || 93
|-
| align="left"|‡ || align="center"| PG
| 26 || 0 || 212 || 31 || 28 || 12 || 5 || 55
|-
| align="left"|≠ || align="center"| C
| 26 || 19 || 648 || 172 || 101 || 24 || 23 || 237
|-
| align="left"| || align="center"| SG
| style=";"|80 || style=";"|80 || 2,216 || 317 || 126 || 73 || 53 || 821
|-
| align="left"| || align="center"| C
| 74 || 51 || 2,010 || style=";"|601 || 99 || 29 || style=";"|103 || 1,112
|-
| align="left"| || align="center"| SF
| 60 || 60 || 2,040 || 439 || 199 || style=";"|106 || 24 || style=";"|1,596
|-
| align="left"|≠ || align="center"| PG
| 23 || 3 || 433 || 60 || 50 || 9 || 6 || 161
|-
| align="left"| || align="center"| PG
| 65 || 65 || 2,213 || 312 || style=";"|564 || 91 || 31 || 926
|-
| align="left"| || align="center"| PG
| 12 || 0 || 55 || 9 || 6 || 0 || 0 || 29
|-
| align="left"|≠ || align="center"| SG
| 26 || 1 || 344 || 45 || 27 || 21 || 2 || 69
|-
| align="left"|≠ || align="center"| SG
| 8 || 0 || 104 || 12 || 8 || 1 || 1 || 51
|-
| align="left"|† || align="center"| SF
| 40 || 1 || 562 || 68 || 22 || 18 || 10 || 218
|-
| align="left"|≠ || align="center"| SF
| 10 || 0 || 67 || 5 || 1 || 1 || 1 || 35
|-
| align="left"|† || align="center"| C
| 38 || 2 || 423 || 156 || 16 || 13 || 8 || 183
|-
| align="left"|≠ || align="center"| PF
| 4 || 0 || 38 || 17 || 4 || 1 || 1 || 7
|-
| align="left"| || align="center"| SG
| 60 || 3 || 1,126 || 139 || 91 || 39 || 13 || 516
|-
| align="left"|† || align="center"| SG
| 22 || 0 || 103 || 13 || 0 || 1 || 0 || 30
|-
| align="left"| || align="center"| PF
| style=";"|80 || 79 || style=";"|2,548 || 549 || 248 || 73 || 52 || 1,354
|-
| align="left"|† || align="center"| C
| 30 || 10 || 564 || 216 || 29 || 13 || 23 || 384
|-
| align="left"| || align="center"| PG
| 64 || 28 || 1,760 || 167 || 307 || 57 || 20 || 701
|-
| align="left"|† || align="center"| PG
| 49 || 2 || 897 || 125 || 110 || 46 || 15 || 337
|}
After all games.
‡Waived during the season
†Traded during the season
≠Acquired during the season

Playoffs

|-
| align="left"| || align="center"| PF
| 2 || 0 || 4 || 1 || 0 || 0 || 1 || 5
|-
| align="left"| || align="center"| C
| style=";"|24 || style=";"|24 || 735 || 153 || 73 || 21 || style=";"|26 || 226
|-
| align="left"| || align="center"| SG
| style=";"|24 || style=";"|24 || 684 || 87 || 26 || 31 || 11 || 166
|-
| align="left"| || align="center"| C
| style=";"|24 || 0 || 500 || 143 || 22 || 11 || 23 || 225
|-
| align="left"| || align="center"| SF
| style=";"|24 || style=";"|24 || style=";"|939 || style=";"|218 || 94 || style=";"|40 || 17 || style=";"|732
|-
| align="left"| || align="center"| PG
| 8 || 0 || 27 || 3 || 4 || 1 || 0 || 9
|-
| align="left"| || align="center"| PG
| style=";"|24 || style=";"|24 || 901 || 117 || style=";"|159 || 31 || 7 || 361
|-
| align="left"| || align="center"| SG
| 11 || 0 || 48 || 3 || 4 || 2 || 0 || 5
|-
| align="left"| || align="center"| SG
| 14 || 0 || 66 || 9 || 1 || 4 || 1 || 22
|-
| align="left"| || align="center"| SF
| 10 || 0 || 28 || 5 || 1 || 0 || 1 || 8
|-
| align="left"| || align="center"| PF
| 8 || 0 || 28 || 13 || 3 || 0 || 0 || 2
|-
| align="left"| || align="center"| SG
| 23 || 0 || 366 || 51 || 26 || 9 || 0 || 150
|-
| align="left"| || align="center"| PF
| style=";"|24 || style=";"|24 || 891 || 171 || 66 || 25 || 17 || 455
|-
| align="left"| || align="center"| PG
| style=";"|24 || 0 || 592 || 42 || 62 || 18 || 6 || 192
|}

Transactions

Trades

Free agency

Re-signed

Additions

Subtractions

Awards

References

Toronto Raptors seasons
Toronto Raptors
Toronto Raptors
Toronto Raptors
Tor
Eastern Conference (NBA) championship seasons
NBA championship seasons